Muhammad Moeen Wattoo (born 15 September 1955) is a Pakistani politician who has been a member of the National Assembly of Pakistan, since August 2018. Previously he was a member of the National Assembly from June 2013 to May 2018 and a member of the Provincial Assembly of Punjab from 2008 to 2013.

Early life
He was born on 15 September 1955.

Political career

He ran for the seat of the National Assembly of Pakistan as a candidate of Pakistan Muslim League (Q) (PML-Q) from Constituency NA-147 (Okara-V) in 2002 Pakistani general election but was unsuccessful. He received 50,040 votes and lost the seat to Robina Shaheen Wattoo, a candidate of Pakistan Muslim League (J).

He was elected to the Provincial Assembly of Punjab as an independent candidate from Constituency PP-193 (Okara-IX) in 2008 Pakistani general election. He received 41,498 votes and defeated Dewan Akhlaq Ahmad, a candidate of PML-Q. Following his successful election, he joined Pakistan Muslim League (N) (PML-N) in February 2008.

He was elected to the National Assembly  as a candidate of PML-N from Constituency NA-147 (Okara-V) in 2013 Pakistani general election. He received 87,266 votes and defeated Manzoor Wattoo. In the same election, Wattoo was also elected to the Provincial Assembly of Punjab as a candidate of PML-N from Constituency PP-193 (Okara-IX). He received 30,137 votes and defeated an independent candidate, Dewan Ikhlaq Ahmad. Wattoo vacated the Punjab Assembly seat.

He was re-elected to the National Assembly as a candidate of PML-N from Constituency NA-144 (Okara-IV) in 2018 Pakistani general election.

References

Living people
Pakistan Muslim League (N) politicians
Punjabi people
Pakistani MNAs 2013–2018
1955 births
Punjab MPAs 2008–2013
Pakistani MNAs 2018–2023